Alice in Earnestland is a 2015 South Korean black comedy film written and directed by Ahn Gooc-jin, in his first feature film. It premiered at the 16th Jeonju International Film Festival where it received the Grand Prize in the Korean Competition; jury member and noted East Asian film critic Tony Rayns praised the film as "Funny, shocking and sometimes cruel, this film has enough invention and energy to take your breath away."

Plot
Soo-nam is a poor woman struggling to pay the hospital bills for her vegetative husband's care, even though her hard work seems to be hopeless. She is suddenly granted the chance for a turnabout when a redevelopment project takes place. When that falls through, Soo-nam discards her honesty and adapts a cold-blooded approach to take revenge on whoever is responsible for her debt-ridden life.

Cast
Lee Jung-hyun as Soo-nam
Lee Hae-young as Gyu-jung
Seo Young-hwa as Kyung-sook
Myung Gye-nam as Do-chul
Lee Jun-hyeok as Hyung-suk
Bae Je-ki as Detective Jo
Lee Dae-yeon as Chief
Ji Dae-han as Detective Park
Lee Yong-nyeo
Oh Kwang-rok as Art professor
Lee Seung-joon

Awards and nominations

References

External links

 

2015 films
South Korean black comedy films
2010s South Korean films